{{DISPLAYTITLE:C12H18N2O}}
The molecular formula C12H18N2O (molar mass: 206.28 g/mol, exact mass: 206.1419 u) may refer to:

 Oxotremorine
 Pivhydrazine, also known as pivalylbenzhydrazine or pivazide